A giant solitary trichoepithelioma is a cutaneous condition characterized by a skin lesion that may be up to several centimeters in diameter.

See also 
 Trichoepithelioma
 Skin lesion

References

External links 

Epidermal nevi, neoplasms, and cysts